"The End Is the Beginning" is the first episode of the sixth season of the post-apocalyptic horror television series Fear the Walking Dead, which aired on AMC on October 11, 2020, in the United States. The episode was written by Andrew Chambliss and Ian Goldberg, and directed by Michael E. Satrazemis.

Plot 
Virginia hires Emile, a bounty hunter, to find Morgan Jones' whereabouts and bring her his head. Morgan is in bad shape due to his gunshot wound, which is infected and gangrenous. However, his wound due to its odor, repels the walkers.

Morgan meets a man named Isaac on the road who offers his help, but Morgan refuses his help because he doesn't want Isaac involved. Emile and his dog arrive outside the store they are hiding in. Isaac comes out and Emile asks him about Morgan and his whereabouts but he denies everything. Realizing that he is nervous, Emile enters the store, but Morgan is gone. Emile then leaves with his dog.

Isaac takes Morgan to his shelter and tries to extract the bullet from his wound, but Morgan fights him off. Isaac asks Morgan to help him get to his wife, who is pregnant. Emile manages to find Morgan's whereabouts and prepares to kill Isaac, but Morgan shoots him in the arm and the two manage to flee in his truck. On the way, Isaac reveals to Morgan that he was a member of Virginia's group, but he and his wife left their group for a better life.

Isaac takes Morgan to the valley where his wife is and they kill all the walkers surrounding it. That night, Emile manages to find both of them again and Morgan surrenders to Emile, in exchange to spare Isaac. Emile is then attacked by Isaac, but he is soon overpowered by Emile, knocking Isaac down. Morgan manages to fight off Emile and knock him down, and Isaac reveals he was bitten by a walker. Emile gets up and has a fight with Morgan, which in the end, Morgan manages to defeat and beheads Emile. Morgan wakes the next day, and finds his bullet has been extracted, and that Isaac's wife Rachel has given birth to their daughter. Morgan learns that Isaac succumbed to his infection and died. Rachel tells Morgan they have named their daughter after him. Morgan says goodbye to Rachel. Later, Morgan leaves Emile's decapitated head in a box for Virginia to find, much to her surprise. Elsewhere, two men spray-paint "The End Is the Beginning" on a large submarine stranded off the Galveston coast while waiting for Emile to bring them a mysterious key that is now in Morgan's possession.

Reception

Critical response 

Matt Fowler of IGN gave "The End is the Beginning" a 8/10 rating, stating; "Fear the Walking Dead may have only showed us the fate of one of its characters, but the episode, considering how hard it is to give Morgan something new to do, was pretty strong." David S.E. Zapanta of Den of Geek! gave it a rating of 4/5, writing: "By episode’s end, Morgan finally embraces his rebirth, declaring over the radio to Virginia, Morgan Jones is dead. And you are dealing with someone else now.' As to whether he deserves this second chance remains to be seen." Alex Zalben of Decider praised Morgan's character development and James' performance.

Ratings 
The episode was seen by 1.59 million viewers in the United States on its original air date, above the previous episodes.

References

External links

 "The End Is the Beginning" at AMC.com
 

2020 American television episodes
Fear the Walking Dead (season 6) episodes